Comitas granuloplicata is a species of sea snail, a marine gastropod mollusc in the family Pseudomelatomidae, the turrids and allies.

Distribution
This marine species is endemic to Australia and occurs off Western Australia.

References

 Kosuge, S. 1992. Report on the family Turridae collected along the north-western coast of Australia (Gastropoda). Bulletin of the Institute of Malacology, Tokyo 2(10): pls 58–59, text figs 1–24

External links
 

granuloplicata
Gastropods described in 1992
Gastropods of Australia